Painted is the debut studio album by American singer Lucky Daye. It was released on May 24, 2019, by Keep Cool Records and RCA Records. The album was broken up into two EP's, a part of a series to lead up to his debut album.

The album received a nomination for Best R&B Album at the 62nd Grammy Awards, while the album's lead single "Roll Some Mo" received nominations for Best R&B Song and Best R&B Performance. Album cut "Real Games" received a nomination in the Best Traditional R&B Performance category. In honor of the album's first anniversary, a deluxe edition of Painted was released  in May 2020 including new mixes and alternative versions of previously released songs as well as four new tracks.

Background

After he previously competed on American Idol during Season 4 in 2005, at age 19, Daye established himself as a songwriter and background vocalist and landed credits in 2008 on songs by Keith Sweat on his album Just Me and Ne-Yo on "She Got Her Own". During this time, he briefly went under the alias of "D. Brown." In 2014, he wrote for Boyz II Men on the song "Believe Us". During 2016 and 2017, he co-wrote songs released by Keke Palmer ("Enemiez"), Ella Mai ("10,000 Hours," "Down"), Trey Songz ("Song Goes Off"), and two tracks from the album Strength of a Woman by Mary J. Blige, among other contemporary R&B artists.

In October 2018, Daye announced that he signed to Keep Cool Records and RCA Records, and released his first single called "Roll Some Mo". On November 9, he released his first EP titled I, which is part of a series leading up to Painted.

On January 17, 2019, Daye released the first single from the second EP in the series called "Karma". On February 6, 2019, he released the second installment of the EP series, II. He is slated to go on tour with Ella Mai beginning in February 2019.

All of the songs were written by Lucky Daye, and were executive produced by D'Mile, recorded in 2018. Of the 15 they finished, 13 appear on the album. To promote the album, he released two EP's with segments of the album: I on November 9, 2018, and II on February 6, 2019.

Singles
In October 2018, Lucky Daye announced that he was signed to the RCA joint venture Keep Cool, and released his first single called "Roll Some Mo". On January 17, 2019, Lucky Daye released the second single called "Karma". "Love You Too Much" was released as the third and final single on April 25, 2019.

Track listing

References

2019 debut albums
RCA Records albums
Albums produced by D'Mile
Lucky Daye albums